Stephanie Nguyen is an American politician in the California State Assembly representing the 10th district. Elected in 2022, she previously served on the Elk Grove City Council after being appointed in 2017.

Early life and education 
Nguyen was born in the United States to refugees from Vietnam. She received a bachelor's degree in humanities from Sacramento State University, aspiring to be a teacher.

Career 
Nguyen previously served as executive director of Asian Resources Inc., a Sacramento-based nonprofit organization supporting Asian Americans and immigrants.

Nguyen was appointed to the Elk Grove City Council in 2017 after incumbent Steve Ly was elected mayor. She served through 2022, representing the 4th district.

California Assembly
Nguyen was elected to the California State Assembly for the 10th district in 2022. The Sacramento County district includes Elk Grove, Florin, Vineyard and parts of Sacramento. The district, previously numbered the 9th district, was represented by Democrat Jim Cooper who retired to run for Sheriff of Sacramento County.

She placed first in the nonpartisan blanket primary with 29.9% of the vote, advancing to the general election alongside fellow Democrat and Sacramento City Councilmember Eric Guerra. She defeated Guerra in the general election with 53.8% of the vote. Oil interests reportedly spent $979,000 supporting Nguyen through independent expenditures.

Electoral history

Personal life
Nguyen lives in Elk Grove with her husband, a police officer, and their two daughters. Stephanie grew up with six siblings.

References

External links 

Campaign website

Democratic Party members of the California State Assembly
Living people
American politicians of Vietnamese descent
American women of Vietnamese descent in politics
Asian American and Pacific Islander state legislators in California
21st-century American politicians
California politicians of Vietnamese descent
Women state legislators in California
21st-century American women politicians
People from Elk Grove, California
American people of Vietnamese descent
Year of birth missing (living people)